Dalian People's Stadium was a former multi-purpose stadium located in the Olympic Square in Dalian, Liaoning, China. The stadium was built in 1976 and had a capacity of 55,843. It was the home stadium of former local football team Dalian Shide. The stadium has been demolished and the site is now used for a major shopping mall, the Olympia 66.

References

Buildings and structures in Dalian
Football venues in China
Sport in Dalian
Multi-purpose stadiums in China
Sports venues in Liaoning